Tibor Mičinec (born 10 October 1958) is a retired Slovak footballer who played as a forward.

Honours

 1982–83 Czechoslovak First League
 1988–89 Cypriot First Division
 1990–91 Cypriot Cup
 Top scorer, 1993–94 Czech 2. Liga

External links
 
 

1958 births
Living people
Slovak footballers
Czechoslovakia international footballers
Czechoslovak footballers
Czech First League players
Association football forwards
Bohemians 1905 players
FC Zbrojovka Brno players
FC DAC 1904 Dunajská Streda players
AC Omonia players
CD Logroñés footballers
SK Benešov players
FC Fastav Zlín players
Slovak expatriate sportspeople in Spain
Czech expatriate sportspeople in Spain
People from Kremnica
Sportspeople from the Banská Bystrica Region